The 2008–09 Football League Championship (known as the Coca-Cola Championship for sponsorship reasons) was the sixth season of the league under its current title and seventeenth season under its current league division format.

Wolverhampton Wanderers won the division to return to the Premier League after a five-year absence. They secured the Championship title on 25 April, one week after having confirmed their promotion with a victory over QPR.

Birmingham City were promoted at the first attempt following their relegation. They secured their return to the top flight on the final day of the season by winning at promotion rivals Reading 2–1. Norwich City, Southampton and Charlton Athletic were relegated;

Burnley won the play-offs to reach the Premier League for the first time after a 1–0 win in the play-off final against Sheffield United, who had been in with a chance of automatic promotion on the final day.

Team changes from previous season
Joining the Championship
Relegated from the Premier League:
 Reading
 Birmingham City
 Derby County

Promoted from League One:
 Swansea City
 Nottingham Forest
 Doncaster Rovers

Leaving the Championship
Promoted to the Premier League:
 West Bromwich Albion
 Stoke City
 Hull City

Relegated to League One:
 Leicester City
 Scunthorpe United
 Colchester United

Team overview

Stadium and locations

Personnel and sponsoring

Managerial changes

League table

Play-offs

Results

Top goalscorers

Awards

PFA Team of the Year

Events

Goal controversies
On 20 September 2008, during Watford's home game against Reading, the assistant referee Nigel Banister adjudged that a John Eustace own goal had opened the scoring for Reading. In fact, the ball had gone four yards wide of the goal after Eustace challenged Royals forward Noel Hunt and a corner should therefore have been awarded. Referee Stuart Attwell followed the signal by the assistant and awarded the goal. The next day Reading manager Steve Coppell said that he was happy for the game to be replayed, but his offer was turned down when an official said, "the referee's decision is final."
On 6 December 2008 an apparent Bristol City goal against Swansea City was not awarded after both the linesman and referee failed to see the ball cross the line. This led Bristol City manager Gary Johnson to add to calls for goal-line technology.

Southampton administration
On 23 April 2009, The Football League announced that Southampton had been placed into administration. The ruling occurred after the deadline for immediate points deduction application, so the ten-point deduction would have to await whether or not Southampton, in 22nd place at the time of the announcement, were relegated. If they had finished above the relegation zone, then the points would have been deducted from their total for the current year to thereby relegate them. However, since their relegation was confirmed following their penultimate match, their point penalty would be applied the next season in League One.

References

 
EFL Championship seasons
1
2
Eng